Ágoston Endrödy (13 October 1902 – 1990) was a Hungarian equestrian. He competed in two events at the 1936 Summer Olympics.

References

External links
 

1902 births
1990 deaths
Hungarian male equestrians
Olympic equestrians of Hungary
Equestrians at the 1936 Summer Olympics
Sportspeople from Pest County